The Backspacer Tour was a concert tour by the American rock band Pearl Jam to support its ninth studio album, Backspacer (2009). Fifty-six shows were played, across North America, Europe and Oceania.

History
Pearl Jam promoted Backspacer with tours in Europe, North America and Oceania in 2009 and further legs in North America and Europe in 2010.

In August 2009, Pearl Jam headlined the Outside Lands Music and Arts Festival, which was preceded by five shows in Europe and three in North America. This tour preceded the release of Pearl Jam's 2009 album, Backspacer. On August 11, 2009, the band played an intimate show at the Shepherd's Bush Empire in London. The band was joined onstage by The Rolling Stones guitarist Ronnie Wood to play a cover of "All Along the Watchtower". Later that night the band was joined by Simon Townshend, younger brother of Pete Townshend, to perform The Who's "The Real Me".

On August 21, 2009, the band played in Toronto. Ted Leo and the Pharmacists were scheduled to be the support band, but Leo was unable to attend, after being stuck at the border. This resulted in vocalist Eddie Vedder taking to the stage to cover Neil Young's "Sugar Mountain" and "The Needle and the Damage Done". Guitarist Mike McCready then played two songs, followed by guitarist Stone Gossard covering "You Can't Put Your Arms Around a Memory" by Johnny Thunders, before The Pharmacists played their set.

In October 2009, Pearl Jam headlined the Austin City Limits Music Festival. The Austin City Limits appearance took place amidst the fourteen-date North American leg of the tour. On October 6, 2009, the band played in Los Angeles at the Gibson Amphitheatre. They were joined onstage by former Soundgarden frontman Chris Cornell to perform the Temple of the Dog song "Hunger Strike". This was followed with an appearance by Alice In Chains guitarist Jerry Cantrell on "Alive".

Pearl Jam was the final band that performed at the Wachovia Spectrum with four shows that took place on October 27–28 and October 30–31. At the final show at the Spectrum, the band played the song "Bugs" from their 1994 album Vitalogy for the first time. The band also performed a cover of Devo's "Whip It" in full costume. An additional leg consisting of a tour of Oceania took place afterward. The band played at the New Orleans Jazz & Heritage Festival on May 1, 2010. They then played twelve dates in America in the same month and completed a second European leg in July 2010.

While most shows on the 2010 US leg were met with positive reviews, Dan Aquilante of the New York Post commenting on the first night at Madison Square Garden, said the lyrics were "mostly indiscernible" and "were little more than garbled jibber-jabber". At the show at the O2 in Dublin, a fan broke his arm in three places, after he jumped off the balcony and landed on the canopy above the mixing desk.

Official bootlegs are available for this tour through the band's official website in FLAC, MP3, and CD formats.

Opening acts
Gomez — 2009 European leg (excluding August 11)
The Pharmacists — August 21, 2009
Bad Religion — August 23 & 24, 2009 and October 30 & 31, 2009
Ben Harper and Relentless7 — September 21, 2009 – October 9, 2009 (excluding October 4), Oceania, 2010 European tour (excluding festival dates)
Social Distortion — October 27 & 28, 2009
Liam Finn — Oceania
Band of Horses — 2010 North America leg (excluding May 20)
The Black Keys — May 20, 2010

Tour dates

Festivals and other miscellaneous performances

This concert was a part of "Outside Lands Music and Arts Festival"
This concert was a part of "Austin City Limits Music Festival"
This concert was a part of "New Orleans Jazz & Heritage Festival"
This concert was a part of "Hard Rock Calling"
This concert was a part of "Rock In Park Festival"
This concert was a part of "Open'er Festival"
This concert was a part of "Main Square Festival"
This concert was a part of "Rock Werchter"
This concert was a part of "Heineken Jammin' Festival"
This concert was a part of "BBK Live Festival"
This concert was a part of "Optimus Alive!"

Band members
Pearl Jam
Jeff Ament – bass guitar
Stone Gossard – rhythm guitar
Mike McCready – lead guitar
Eddie Vedder – lead vocals, guitar
Matt Cameron – drums

Additional musicians
Boom Gaspar – Hammond B3 and keyboards

Gallery

References

2009 concert tours
2010 concert tours
Pearl Jam concert tours